Dante Gebel (born July 6, 1968, in Billinghurst, Buenos Aires, Argentina) is an Argentine writer, pastor, talk show host and television personality, best known for hosting the Dante Night Show on TV Azteca.

Pastor 
From 2009 to 2012 he was pastor of the Hispanic church at Crystal Cathedral, Garden Grove, California . After that the congregation moved to the Anaheim Convention Center and was renamed Favorday Church  He currently pastors the megachurch River Church in Anaheim, California. 

Gebel gave a speech and prayed for the President of El Salvador Nayib Bukele at his inauguration ceremony on June 1, 2019 

He is the author of several books written in Spanish.

Books 
 Pasión de multitudes 
 Las arenas del alma 
 El código del campeón 
 Marea Baja 
 Low Tide  (English) 
 Destinado al éxito 
 El amor en los tiempos del Facebook

References 

1968 births
Living people
Argentine television personalities